Bigger  is the sixth studio album by American country music duo Sugarland. It was released on June 8, 2018, through Big Machine Records. This is their first album in eight years since 2010's The Incredible Machine, and first on Big Machine.

Background
After a five-year hiatus, at the 51st Annual CMA Awards, Bush and Nettles reunited to present Vocal Duo of the Year. Nettles mentioned all the years that Sugarland won Vocal Duo of the Year, "2007, 2008, 2009, 2010, 2011…and well, who knows?", teasing new music from the duo. After the ceremony, the two tweeted a photo of themselves at the CMA's with the caption #StillTheSame. 
The lead single "Still the Same" was released on December 21, 2017. Sugarland announced the album, album title and track listing on April 12, 2018. One of the songs on the album, "Babe" features American singer-songwriter Taylor Swift. Swift wrote the song with Train frontman Patrick Monahan for her 2012 album Red but the song didn't release in the album. After the CMA's Swift got in touch with Sugarland, told them how excited she was that they were getting back together and mentioned she had a song for them. This is the first song Sugarland have recorded that wasn't written by Bush and Nettles.

Promotion
Sugarland performed for the first time in five years at Dick Clark's New Year's Rockin Eve With Ryan Seacrest 2018, and performed "Still the Same". On May 8, 2018 they performed their second single "Babe" on Live with Kelly and Ryan becoming the debut televised performance of the song; the duo then performed the title-track "Bigger" off-camera just for the studio audience.

The duo supported the album on the Still the Same Tour which began on May 4, 2018, in Durant, Oklahoma and concluded later in the year on September 9, in Philadelphia, Pennsylvania.

Singles
"Still the Same" is the lead single from the album and was released on December 21, 2017.

"Babe" featuring Taylor Swift, the second single from the album, was released on April 20, 2018.

Promotional singles
The title-track, "Bigger", was released as a promotional single on April 12, 2018. "Mother" was released April 27, 2018 as another promotional single.

Critical reception

Stephen Thomas Erlewine of All Music gave it four out of five star rating saying, that the album "does indeed deliver on its titular promise to be a grand, majestic album, but emotions are not in its skyscraper sweep." Brittany McKenna of Rolling Stone was positive saying, "The arrangements of Bigger are grander, the vocals more theatrical, and the themes – which occasionally veer into the political – decidedly more topical. The album takes cue from current trends while adamantly retaining the spirit that made their songs like "Stay" such massive hits. In other words, it's still a Sugarland record, but one tailor-made for our odd moment, where female voices like Nettles' are louder than ever thanks to movements like #MeToo and Time's Up but still largely missing from country radio." Jermey Burchard of Wide Open Country describes the album as "their best yet", and they "are coming back into the county landscape at more creative and promising timing."

Commercial performance
Bigger debuted at No. 2 on Top Country Albums based on 30,000 album equivalent units, 26,000 of which are traditional album sales. It sold another 5,000 copies (7,600 units) the second week. It has sold 57,500 copies in the United States as of December 2018.

Track listing
Adapted from Rolling Stone.

Personnel
Credits adapted from AllMusic.

Vocals and songwriting
Kristian Bush – vocals, songwriter
Amie Miriello – background vocals
Patrick Monahan — songwriter
Jennifer Nettles – vocals, songwriter
Tim Owens — songwriter
Taylor Swift – background vocals, featuring vocals and songwriter

Musicians

David Angel – violin
Monisa Angell – violin
Tom Bukovac – electric guitar
Brandon Bush – keyboards
Kristian Bush – acoustic guitar, electric guitar, mandolin
Paul Bushnell – bass guitar
Wei Tsun Chang – violin 
Janet Darnell – violin 
Alicia Enstrom – violin 
Victor Indrizzo – drums
Shawn Pelton – drums 
Carole Rabinowitz – cello
Danny Rader – electric guitar 
Justin Schipper – steel guitar
Kristin Wilkinson – violin 
Karen Winkelmann – violin 

Production

Austin Atwood – assistant 
Sandy Spika Borchetta – art direction 
Sean R. Badum – assistant engineer 
Brandon Bush – production coordinator, string arrangements
Kristian Bush – photography, producer, programming
Adam Chagnon – engineer
Justin Ford – art direction, graphic design 
Ted Jensen — mastering
Kevin Kane – assistant 
Nick Karpen – mixing assistant 
Shervin Lainez – photography 
Chris Lord-Alge – mixer
Jennifer Nettles – producer 
Juilan Raymond – producer 
Zoe Rosen – assistant, production coordinator 
Brianna Steinitz – production coordinator 
Tom Tapely – engineer 
Myles Turney – assistant engineer 
Butch Walker – vocal producer 
Jeremy Wheatly – mixer 
Howard Willing – string engineer

Charts

Weekly charts

Year-end charts

References

2018 albums
Big Machine Records albums
Sugarland albums
Albums produced by Julian Raymond